Gary Patrick Angelo Dell'Abate (born March 14, 1961), also known by the nickname Baba Booey, is an American radio producer who has been the executive producer of The Howard Stern Show since 1984. His autobiography, They Call Me Baba Booey, was released on November 2, 2010.

Early life and career
Dell'Abate was born in the New York City borough of Brooklyn and raised in Uniondale, New York, on Long Island. He comes from a large Italian-American family. His father, Salvatore Dell'ABate, was a salesman for Häagen-Dazs ice cream, while his mother, Ellen (née Cotroneo) was a food demonstrator at Macy's in New York City and Fortunoff on Long Island. Dell'Abate attended Adelphi University, receiving the Richard F. Clemo Award in his senior year, and he interned at several radio stations, including WLIR. While working with Roz Frank, a traffic reporter on WNBC, he came into contact with Howard Stern.

The Howard Stern Show 
Dell'Abate has worked on The Howard Stern Show since September 4, 1984: originally on 66 WNBC, then syndicated through K-Rock in New York City, and later broadcast on Sirius XM Radio. Dell'Abate was originally hired for $150 a week, with duties including getting Stern's lunch and scheduling guests for the show.

Baba Booey 
Previously nicknamed "Boy-Gary" (Howard called his college roommate Dr. Lew Weinstein "boy" when giving an order; preceded by "Boy" Lee Davis at WNBC), Dell'Abate's "Baba Booey" moniker originated on The Howard Stern Show on July 26, 1990, after telling a story of his prized collection of animation cels. In the course of discussing a Quick Draw McGraw cel he might purchase, he misstated the name of McGraw's sidekick Baba Looey as "Baba Booey". As is typical of the show, the rest of the cast "goofed" on his mistake, becoming especially merciless since he was mulling the purchase of a cel of a character without even knowing the character's correct name. Speaking to Stern at the end of the show, Dell'Abate said, "I think we've taken this as far as it will go." Stern replied, "Gary, we've only scratched the surface of this." Dell'Abate remains Baba Booey to this day. Eventually, he titled his autobiography They Call Me Baba Booey. Dell'Abate later recalled that when he watched the cartoon as a child, Quick Draw would often call Baba Looey "Baba Boy", usually in frantic moments ("Help me, Baba Boy!"). Quick Draw's drawn-out pronunciation of "boy" often sounded like "booey", which led Dell'Abate to think that the character's name was actually "Baba Booey".

"Baba Booey" as a term has become a mantra for fans of The Howard Stern Show and is often used during prank calls to live network television or radio broadcasts; for example, a call made by a prank caller nicknamed "Maury from Brooklyn" to ABC News during the low-speed police chase of O. J. Simpson's Ford Bronco through the streets of Brentwood, Los Angeles, California, signed off with "And Baba Booey to y'all!" Sportscaster Al Michaels explained to anchor Peter Jennings the significance of the phrase. In the 2012 Olympics, Freestyle wrestler Jake Herbert yelled "Baba Booey" as the camera panned over Team USA during the opening ceremony. Since then it has become a trend in sporting events where concentration and silence are expected, for spectators to shout "Baba Booey!" as in the case of the PGA Tour as soon as a golfer has completed his swing.

Personal life 
Dell'Abate has been married since 1992 to Mary Dell'Abate (née Caracciolo). They have two sons, Lucas and Jackson.

After Dell'Abate's brother Steven died of AIDS in January 1991, Dell'Abate became a supporter of LIFEbeat: The Music Industry Fights AIDS and served as the charity's president.

Dell'Abate wrote his autobiography, They Call Me Baba Booey, which was a New York Times best seller. It debuted at #6 on the NY Times Best Seller list in November 2010. In the book, Dell'Abate tells the story of his brother's death from AIDS, his mother's struggle with depression as well as his rise to executive producer of The Howard Stern Show.

Dell'Abate is an avid New York Mets fan, and, on May 9, 2009, threw out the ceremonial first pitch at a Mets game. The pitch did not go well, as it landed down the third-base line and hit an umpire. He later attended the 2015 World Series with fellow Howard Stern Show co-worker Richard Christy (who is a Kansas City Royals fan). Dell'Abate is also a fan of the New York Islanders hockey team, and was interviewed for the 2012 book, Dynasty: The Oral History of the New York Islanders, 1972–1984, by author Greg Prato. Dell'Abate's thoughts and memories of following the Islanders (he also interned for the television station that broadcast the team's games at the time, SportsChannel) are featured throughout the book, as well as several photos of Dell'Abate with Islanders players at a Stanley Cup victory parade in 1980.

On March 14, 2011, Dell'Abate was appointed to the Greenwich, Connecticut, Board of Parks and Recreation with a 119–64 vote margin. The Greenwich Town Meeting unanimously reappointed Dell'Abate to the Board on June 9, 2014.

References

External links

1961 births
Adelphi University alumni
American people of Italian descent
American radio personalities
American radio producers
Howard Stern
Living people
People from Greenwich, Connecticut
People from Uniondale, New York
Sirius Satellite Radio
American autobiographers